Marcello Tittarelli (born 14 April 1962) is an Italian former sports shooter who won two gold medals with the national team at senior level at the World Championships. He also competed in the men's trap event at the 1996 Summer Olympics.

Career
He won five international medals at senior level in the World Cup.

References

External links
 

1962 births
Living people
Italian male sport shooters
Olympic shooters of Italy
Shooters at the 1996 Summer Olympics
Sportspeople from Ancona
20th-century Italian people